The Maio Airport (Portuguese Aeródromo do Maio)   is an airport in Cape Verde located in the island of Maio, about 3 km north of the island capital Porto Inglês. Of the seven functioning civil airports in Cape Verde, Maio is the airport with the least traffic.

Airlines and destinations

Statistics

See also
List of airports in Cape Verde

References

External links
TACV Timetable for Maio

Airports in Cape Verde
Maio, Cape Verde